Clydonopteron pomponius is a species of snout moth. It was described by Herbert Druce in 1895. It is found in Mexico and Guatemala.

References

Moths described in 1895
Chrysauginae